The 2020 Vermont Republican presidential primary took place on March 3, 2020, as one of 14 contests scheduled for Super Tuesday in the Republican Party primaries for the 2020 presidential election.

Results
Bill Weld's 10% share of the vote was his best performance of any state.

Results by county

See also
 2020 Vermont Democratic presidential primary

References

Republican primary
Vermont
Vermont Republican primary
Vermont Republican primaries